The Cinemile is a film review podcast hosted by Dave Corkery and Cathy Cullen.

Concept and history 
The Cinemile is a two-person podcast. Launched in 2016, it consists of conversations between a married couple from Cork, Dave Corkery and Cathy Cullen, on their walk home from the movies. To celebrate the 100th episode of the show, Cullen and Corkery vacationed in Spain and reviewed The Shape of Water. Launched when the hosts lived in London, the podcast is, as of 2022, made in Ireland.

Reception 
Miranda Sawyer of The Observer said the show is "[s]uffused with charm and insight." Josh Jones of LeCool London called the show "delightfully simple." New Statesmen named the show "best new podcasts of 2017."

Awards

References

External links 

Official Twitter

Cathy Cullen

Dave Corkery

Audio podcasts
2016 podcast debuts
Film and television podcasts
Irish podcasts